
Year 922 (CMXXII) was a common year starting on Tuesday (link will display the full calendar) of the Julian calendar.

Events 
 By place 

 Byzantine Empire 
 Summer – Battle of Constantinople: Emperor Romanos I sends Byzantine troops to repel another Bulgarian raid at the outskirts of Constantinople. The Byzantines storm the Bulgarian camp, but are defeated when they are confronted by the main Bulgarian forces. Having won the battle, the Bulgarians lack the maritime power to conduct a successful siege of Constantinople.

 Europe 
 Summer – The West Frankish nobles revolt and depose King Charles III (the Simple) after a 24-year reign. He seeks refuge in Lotharingia and is replaced by Robert I, a brother of the late King Odo, who is crowned king of the West Frankish Kingdom in the cathedral at Rheims.
 Adalbert I, margrave of Ivrea, leads a rebellion with the support of the Italian nobles against King Berengar I. He crosses the Alps into Burgundy and invites Rudolph II of Upper Burgundy to invade Italy. Berengar flees again to Verona and Rudolph is crowned King of Italy at Pavia.

 By topic 

 Religion 
 March 26 – Mansur al-Hallaj, a Persian mystic writer, is sentenced to death for heresy after a long trial at Baghdad. Having supported reform in the Abbasid Caliphate, he has been seen as a rabble-rouser, and is flogged, mutilated and executed (by beheading).

Births 
 Hedwig of Nordgau, countess of Luxemburg (approximate date)
 Ibn Abi Zayd, Muslim imam and scholar (d. 996)
 Ki no Tokibumi, Japanese nobleman and waka poet (d. 996)
 Sigfried, founder of Luxemburg (approximate date)
 Wang Pu, Chinese chancellor and writer (d. 982)

Deaths 
 February 20 – Theodora, Byzantine empress
 March 26 – Mansur al-Hallaj, Persian mystic writer
 May 23 – Li Sizhao, Chinese general and governor
 Æthelweard, son of Alfred the Great (or 920)
 Al-Nayrizi, Persian mathematician and astronomer (b. 865)
 Fortún Garcés (the Monk), king of Pamplona
 Galindo II Aznárez, count of Aragon (Spain) 
 Li Cunjin, general of the Tang Dynasty (b. 857)
 Li Cunzhang, general of the Tang Dynasty
 Lucídio Vimaranes, count of Portugal
 Ma Chuo, general and official of Wuyue (or 923)
 Wang Chuzhi, Chinese warlord (b. 862)
 Zhang Chengye, Chinese eunuch official (b. 846)
 Zhang Chujin, Chinese governor (jiedushi)

References